The Area de Conservación Guanacaste is a network of protected areas and a World Heritage Site in Guanacaste Province, in northwestern Costa Rica. The World Heritage Site contains an unbroken tract of tropical dry forest and important habitat for several vulnerable species, including the Central American tapir, mangrove hummingbird, and the great green macaw. Over 7,000 plant species and 900 vertebrate species have been located in the park.

Geography
The area of the national parks combined totals  as of 2004. This reflects a long-term process of growth, which started with the establishment of Santa Rosa National Park in 1971. Over several decades, surrounding lands were purchased and nearby national parks connected to the growing protected area, so that the Guanacaste Conservation Area came to encompass a high diversity of tropical dry forest, rainforest, cloud forest, and marine habitats. The park contains about two-thirds of the endangered animals of Costa Rica.

It formally became part of National System of Conservation Areas—SINAC in 1994, and a World Heritage Site in 1999. In 2004, the World Heritage Site was extended with a private property measuring 15,000 ha in the Santa Elena rain forest.

Elements
The World Heritage Site includes:
Santa Rosa National Park
Guanacaste National Park
Rincón de la Vieja Volcano National Park
Junquillal Bay Wildlife Refuge

See also
Guanacaste Conservation Area
World Heritage Sites in Costa Rica

References

External links
—UNESCO: Area de Conservación Guanacaste World Heritage Site

World Heritage Sites in Costa Rica
Conservation Areas of Costa Rica
Geography of Guanacaste Province
Tourist attractions in Guanacaste Province